Gyliotrachela is a genus of land snails in the family Gastrocoptidae. They are known commonly as trumpetsnails. Some species have the aperture of the shell on a trumpet-shaped extension.

Species
The following species are recognised in the genus Gyliotrachela:
 

Gyliotrachela adela 
Gyliotrachela australis 
Gyliotrachela burchi 
Gyliotrachela concreta 
Gyliotrachela crossei 
Gyliotrachela cultura 
Gyliotrachela depressispira 
Gyliotrachela diarmaidi 
Gyliotrachela emergens 
Gyliotrachela everetti 
Gyliotrachela fruhstorferi 
Gyliotrachela hungerfordiana 
Gyliotrachela khaochakan 
Gyliotrachela khaochongensis 
Gyliotrachela khaowongensis 
Gyliotrachela khaowongkot 
Gyliotrachela kohrin 
Gyliotrachela luctans 
Gyliotrachela modesta 
Gyliotrachela muaklekensis 
Gyliotrachela muangon 
Gyliotrachela phoca 
Gyliotrachela phupaman 
Gyliotrachela plesiolopa 
Gyliotrachela salpinx 
Gyliotrachela saraburiensis 
Gyliotrachela saxicola 
Gyliotrachela sichang 
Gyliotrachela srirachaensis 
Gyliotrachela striolata 
Gyliotrachela surakiti 
Gyliotrachela tarutao 
Gyliotrachela torticollis 
Gyliotrachela transitans 
Gyliotrachela tridentatus 
Gyliotrachela troglodytes

References

Hypselostomatidae
Taxonomy articles created by Polbot